Robert Edmond Gauthiot (13 June 1876, Paris – 11 September 1916, Paris) was a French Orientalist, linguist and explorer. Born in Paris, he became, in 1909, a member of the Société Asiatique and met Paul Pelliot. Together, they translated the Sogdian manuscript Vessantara Jataka, found by Pelliot among the Dunhuang manuscripts in Mogao Cave 17.

Gauthiot interrupted his exploration of the Pamir Mountains in July 1914 to return home to serve as a captain in the infantry during World War I. Gauthiot received the Croix de Guerre before he was wounded at the Second Battle of Artois in spring 1915. He died from injuries at Val de Grâce Hospital.

References
Gorshenina, Svetlana, La Route de Samarcande, éditions Oziane, 2000, p. 196.
Pouillon, Robert, Dictionnaire des orientalistes de langue française, Karthala, 2008, article « Robert Gauthiot ».

Writers from Paris
1876 births
1916 deaths
Linguists from France
French explorers
Recipients of the Croix de Guerre 1914–1918 (France)
French orientalists
French Army officers
Members of the Société Asiatique
Iranologists
Translators from Finnish
Translators from Sanskrit
19th-century translators
French military personnel killed in World War I